Le Triomphe de l'amour is the second solo album by French experimental singer and composer Areski Belkacem (his ninth overall), released in 2010 on the Universal Music Group label. It is his first solo album in four decades, having instead collaborated with Brigitte Fontaine in the meantime.

Track listing

Personnel
 Areski Belkacem
 David Aubaile
 Patrick Baudin
 Nicolas Bauguil
 Frédéric Deville
 Dondieu Divin
 Zaza Fournier
 Hakim Hamadouche
 Bobby Jocky
 Jack Lahana
 Marcel Loeffler
 Didier Malherbe
 Yan Péchin
 Simon Pomarat
 Lucrèce Sanssella
 Vincent Segal

References

2010 albums
Areski Belkacem albums